The South Pole Traverse, also called the South Pole Overland Traverse, is an approximately  flagged route over compacted snow and ice in Antarctica that links McMurdo Station on the coast to the Amundsen–Scott South Pole Station, both operated by the National Science Foundation of the United States. It was constructed by levelling snow and filling in crevasses; flags mark its route from McMurdo Station across the Ross Ice Shelf to the Leverett Glacier, where the route ascends to the polar plateau and on to the South Pole.

Route description

After four years of development, the trail was fully traversed for the first time in 2005, with Caterpillar and Case Corp. tractors pulling specialized sleds to deliver fuel and cargo to the South Pole in about 40 days. The return trip to McMurdo Station, with less fuel and cargo, is substantially quicker. Construction started during the 2002/03 southern summer field season. It was finished in the 2005/2006 southern summer.

The McMurdo Ice Shelf and the Antarctic Plateau are relatively stable. This section of the road needs maintenance each season. The section caused much more construction work than planned, because the ice sheets are likely to move.

History

The National Science Foundation (NSF) in an effort to lower cost and potentially develop a more reliable method of supplying the South Pole Station funded a new "Traverse Program". Bad weather at McMurdo some summers has reduced the total number of supply flights the NSF could make to bring in construction supplies and scientific equipment. In addition, the traverse saves an estimated 40 flights and lowers the carbon footprint over the use of aircraft. After a one-year hiatus, a traverse team re-occupied the trail during the 2007–08 season after extensive work and completed the first operational traverse in 2008–09.

The road also facilitated the movement of heavy equipment needed to implement its proposed South Pole Connectivity Program, a planned optical fiber link between the South Pole and the French–Italian Concordia Station located at Dome C at the edge of the Antarctic Plateau; Concordia has 24-hour access to geosynchronous satellites. Such satellites cannot be used at the poles since they are below the horizon; the South Pole now uses a few older, low-bandwidth satellites that dip sufficiently south of the equator to be usable for several hours daily. These satellites are near the end of their life. The road to McMurdo might provide a regularly maintained alternate route for such a link; however, opinions vary as to the shear zone section's suitability for a long-term cable. The NSF may also choose to deploy several special purpose satellites in polar orbits.

A 7 February 2006 NSF press release stated that 110 tons (100 tonnes) of cargo had been delivered overland to the South Pole Station in a "proof of concept" of the highway.

In February 2013, Maria Leijerstam pedaled a three-wheeled recumbent fatbike over a portion of the South Pole Traverse route, for which she was recognized by Guinness World Records as the first person to arrive at the South Pole by tricycle.

Major intersections

See also

References

Further reading

 Contains a brief overview of fiber versus satellite links.
 Contains a discussion of the proposed highway.

External links

Road infrastructure in Antarctica
McMurdo Station
Transantarctic Mountains
United States Antarctic Program
United States and the Antarctic
2007 establishments in Antarctica